Rieux Cathedral is a Roman Catholic church located in the town of Rieux-Volvestre, France. It has been listed since 1923 as a monument historique by the French Ministry of Culture.

The cathedral was formerly the seat of the Bishopric of Rieux, founded in 1317 and de-established by the Concordat of 1801.

References

External links

Location of the cathedral

Former cathedrals in France
Churches in Haute-Garonne
Monuments historiques of Haute-Garonne